Frederick Samuel Baines (1858 – 1939) was an Anglican bishop.

He was educated at Winchester and University College, Oxford, and ordained in  1882. His first post was as Curate at Holy Trinity, Leeds, after which he was Vicar of St Cuthbert, Hunslet. Later he was Archdeacon of Durban and then Secretary of the Council for Service Abroad. In 1901 he was elevated to the episcopate as  Bishop of Natal and served the diocese for twenty-eight years. He died in office on 17 November 1939.

Baines founded Cordwalles Preparatory School in 1912.

Notes

External links 
 Bukanyana ea merapelo ho batho ba kereke (1911) A simple manual of private devotions and preparation for the Holy Communion in the Sesutho Language. Issued with the approval of the Bishop of Natal. Digitized by Richard Mammana

1858 births
1939 deaths
People educated at Winchester College
Alumni of University College, Oxford
20th-century Anglican Church of Southern Africa bishops
Anglican bishops of Natal
Archdeacons of Durban